John Curtis Christian School is a co-educational, non-sectarian, private Christian K-12 school in River Ridge, Louisiana, in the United States. The school colors are red, white and blue and the school's nickname is Patriots.

History
The school was founded in 1962 by John T. Curtis, Sr., on the second floor of the Carrollton Avenue Baptist Church. On its opening day it had only sixteen students, but by the end of the year it had over forty students. In 1963, Curtis moved the school to its current location on Jefferson Highway in River Ridge, Louisiana.

Athletics
John Curtis Christian athletics competes in the LHSAA.

Championships
Football –
- (1) National championship: 2012
- (26) State championships: 1975, 1977, 1979, 1980, 1981, 1983, 1984, 1985, 1987, 1988, 1990, 1993, 1996, 1997, 1998, 1999, 2001, 2002, 2004, 2005, 2006, 2007, 2008, 2011, 2012, 2018
Baseball – 9 state championships 
Boys Basketball – 1 state championship
Girls Basketball – 6 state championships
Boys Cross Country – 2 state championships
Girls Cross Country – 1 state runner-up
Softball – 10 state championships
Boys Indoor Track and Field – 4 state championships 
Boys Outdoor Track and Field – 10 state championships 
Girls Volleyball – 2 state championships 
Wrestling – 2 state runners-up

Football

Coaches
John T. Curtis Jr. – Head football coach (1969–present), is the second-winningest head coach in high school football history and is the current leader in wins for active head coaches. He is the second high school head football coach to ever reach the 600-win mark. Curtis has a record of 606–74–6 through the 2021 season including one national championship (2012) and twenty-six Louisiana state championships.

Notable alumni
 Tony Bua, NFL linebacker for the Miami Dolphins
 Reggie Dupard, NFL wide receiver and 1st round draft pick for the New England Patriots and Washington Redskins
 Malachi Dupre, NFL wide receiver and 7th round draft pick for the Green Bay Packers, Buffalo Bills, Houston Texans, Seattle Seahawks, Arizona Cardinals and Los Angeles Chargers
 Alan Faneca, NFL offensive guard and two-time offensive lineman of the Year for the Pittsburgh Steelers, New York Jets and Arizona Cardinals; 2021 Inductee into the Pro Football Hall of Fame
 Dillon Gordon, NFL offensive tackle for the Philadelphia Eagles, Kansas City Chiefs and Carolina Panthers
 Melvin Hayes, NFL offensive tackle and 4th round draft pick for the New York Jets and Tennessee Oilers
 Chris Howard, NFL running back and 5th round draft pick for the Jacksonville Jaguars and Denver Broncos
 Clarence Leblanc, NFL safety for the New York Giants
 Joe McKnight, NFL running back and 4th round draft pick for the New York Jets and Kansas City Chiefs
 Duke Riley, NFL linebacker and 3rd round draft pick for the Atlanta Falcons and Philadelphia Eagles
 Michael Stonebreaker, NFL linebacker and 9th round draft pick for the Chicago Bears and New Orleans Saints
 Jonathan Wells, NFL running back and 4th round draft pick for the Houston Texans and Indianapolis Colts
 Danny Wimprine, NFL quarterback for the Cleveland Browns
 Kenny Young, NFL linebacker for the Baltimore Ravens and Los Angeles Rams

Gallery

References

External links
John Curtis Christian School website

Christian schools in Louisiana
Private K-12 schools in Louisiana
Schools in Jefferson Parish, Louisiana
1962 establishments in Louisiana
Educational institutions established in 1962